Vladimir Agishev (born 1 January 1945) is a Soviet former sports shooter. He competed in the 50 metre rifle, three positions event at the 1972 Summer Olympics.

References

External links

1945 births
Living people
Soviet male sport shooters
Olympic shooters of the Soviet Union
Shooters at the 1972 Summer Olympics
Place of birth missing (living people)